Grant Curtis is a film producer, who has worked with director Sam Raimi on The Gift, Drag Me To Hell, the Spider-Man films and Oz the Great and Powerful. He grew up in the rural Missouri town of Warrensburg. Curtis received a master's degree in Mass Communication in 1997 from the University of Central Missouri (UCM), formerly CMSU (located in the town of Warrensburg). He wrote a thesis/screenplay entitled: "And God Stepped Aside". The screenplay examines the relationship between a young man who reluctantly fulfills the dying wishes of his estranged grandmother by taking her to Paris, France. The story was inspired by Curtis' own personal experiences with death within his family. Not long after he completed his thesis/screenplay while he lived in Los Angeles, CA., Curtis' neighbor informed him that director Sam Raimi was looking for an assistant. Curtis interviewed for the position, not entirely confident afterwards that his western Missouri accent and demeanor, not to mention his limited practical experience, garnered Raimi's consideration. After waiting many months, Curtis discovered that he got the job, and his journey towards success began.

In 2002, Curtis received the University of Central Missouri's Alumnus Associations Outstanding Recent Alumni Award.

Aside from producing films, Curtis wrote a book in 2007 called The Spider-Man Chronicles: The Art & Making of Spider-Man 3.

Curtis serves as an executive producer on the 2022 streaming series Moon Knight.

It was announced that both he and Nick Pepin will be co-producing the upcoming film Fantastic Four, set to be released on February 14, 2025.

References

American film producers
Living people
Marvel Studios people
University of Central Missouri alumni
Year of birth missing (living people)